Max M Corporation is the second studio album by Max M, released on January 1, 1994 on Hard Records. On April 18, 1995 Fifth Colvmn Records reissued Max M Corporation with alternate cover art.

Music 
The compositions of Max M Corporation are intended to share the mood generated by the graphic novel contained on the album's multimedia CD-ROM. Both CD issues contain the novel and can be accessed using a IBM PC compatible computer. The compositions "A Day on the Net" and "The Rookie SpaceCadet" were respectively released on 1995's Electro Industrial Assassins and 1996's Hard Target: A Collection of Electronic and Industrial Music From Hard Records, both various artists compilations by Cleopatra Records.

Reception 
Sonic Boom criticized the combination of genres on Max M Corporation, saying "while the music remains dedicated to the genre it is so widely varied in quality at times it makes the album practically unlistenable" and noted that it would have benefited composer Max Møller Rasmussen to shift away from his Clock DVA influences.

Track listing

Personnel
Adapted from the Max M Corporation liner notes.

Max M
 Max Møller Rasmussen – vocals, instruments, producer

Production and design
 After Hours – design

Release history

References

External links 
 
 
 Max M Corporation at iTunes

1994 albums
Max M albums
Fifth Colvmn Records albums